Khun Khan National Park is a national park in Thailand's Chiang Mai Province. This mountainous park is home to forests, waterfalls and cliff-top viewpoints.

Geography
The park's area is 129,959 rai ~  The park is located in the Thanon Thong Chai mountain range.

Attractions
The park features two significant waterfalls, both year-round: the 7-step Huai Mae Na Poe waterfall and the 2-step Huai Tat waterfall.

Flora and fauna

The park features numerous forest types including virgin forest at elevations above . Tree species include three-needled pine, Pinus merkusii, Malacca tree, Mammea siamensis, Malabar ironwood, Baccaurea ramiflora, Calotropis gigantea, Shorea siamensis, Dipterocarpus intricatus, Dipterocarpus tuberculatus, Dioscorea alata, Xylia xylocarpa and Gmelina arborea.

The park serves as a sanctuary for animals including tiger, wild boar, barking deer, goral, Asiatic wild dog (dhole), porcupine, pangolin, masked palm civet and mongoose. Bird life includes red junglefowl and great hornbill.

See also
List of national parks of Thailand
List of Protected Areas Regional Offices of Thailand

References

External links
 Concise Khun Khan National Park information from the Tourism Authority of Thailand

National parks of Thailand
Geography of Chiang Mai province
Tourist attractions in Chiang Mai province